WRRS-LP (104.3 FM) is a radio station licensed to Pittsfield, Massachusetts, United States.  The station serves the Pittsfield area and is currently a program of United Cerebral Palsy of Berkshire County.

See also
List of community radio stations in the United States

References

External links
 

RRS-LP
Community radio stations in the United States
RRS-LP
Radio reading services of the United States
Pittsfield, Massachusetts
Mass media in Berkshire County, Massachusetts
Radio stations established in 2005